Steve Stoll (born 1967, as Stephen Stollmeyer) is an American techno musician and label owner.

Stoll also produces under monikers such as Acid Farm, Ausgang, The Blunted Boy Wonder, Cobalt, Critical Mass, Dark Man, Datacloud, Floating Point, Mr. Proper, The Operator, Storm, Systematic, Test Tones and Time Attack.

Life 
Stoll was born in Staten Island, New York, and raised in Brooklyn, where he learned to play drums. He had three siblings, a brother named Glen, and two sisters, Dorothy and Maria. In the late 1980s he became interested in electronic music while he was drumming for the independent label Wax Trax! Records.

After high school he joined the US Army and served for five years, most notably in the Gulf War. After his release he played drums for Sister Machine Gun, studied Jazz music and later started to produce techno music.

He was signed by Richie Hawtin's label Probe in 1992, where his first solo release Datacloud was released in 1993. Since the mid 1990s he produced a string of Minimal Techno and Acid Techno releases. He also collaborated with musicians such as Pete Namlook, Ken Ishii, Damon Wild and Patrick Codenys of Front 242. Besides releases for novamute, Music Man and Djax-Up-Beats he also runs his own label Proper NYC.

Selected discography 
 1994: Storm – The Art Of Sync (Djax-Up-Beats)
 1995: Acid Farm – The Silver Spiral (Proper N.Y.C.)
 1996: The Operator – Zero Divide (Play It Again Sam)
 1997: Steve Stoll – Damn Analog Technology (Sm:)e Communications)
 1998: Steve Stoll – The Big Apple Bites Back (Mirakkle Records)
 1998: Steve Stoll – The Blunted Boy Wonder (NovaMute)
 1999: Steve Stoll – Supernatural (Proper N.Y.C.)
 2000: Steve Stoll presents The Blunted Boy Wonder – Innuendo (Music Man Records)
 2002: Steve Stoll – Public Address Live (Proper N.Y.C.)
 2003: Steve Stoll – Was Here (FAX +49-69/450464)
 2005: Steve Stoll – Exiled (FAX +49-69/450464)
 2008: Steve Stoll – Locate (Locate)
 2008: Steve Stoll – Zero Point Crossings (FAX +49-69/450464)
 2009: Jeff Green & Steve Stoll – Tangled (Databloem)
 2014: Steve Stoll – Praxis (Psychonavigation Records)

External links 
 
 
 Steve Stoll at MySpace
 Steve Stoll at Kompaktkiste.de

References 

1967 births
Living people
Ableton Live users
Record producers from New York (state)
American techno musicians
Musicians from Brooklyn
People from Staten Island
United States Army soldiers